Captain Swing is a mixed genre album by American folk singer-songwriter Michelle Shocked. It was first released by Mercury Records in 1989 and later reissued by Shocked's own label Mighty Sound in 2004. It was named after Captain Swing, the pseudonymous rebel leader who penned threatening letters during the rural English Swing riots of 1830. The album was a cross-country inventory of swing musical styles—from Dixieland to Western, Big Band to BeBop.

Track listing
All tracks composed by Michelle Shocked; except where indicated
"God Is a Real Estate Developer" (Shocked, Matt Fox) – 3:13
"On the Greener Side" – 2:56
"Silent Ways" – 2:40
"Sleep Keeps Me Awake" – 2:44
"The Cement Lament" – 3:07
"(Don't You Mess Around with) My Little Sister" – 2:39
"Looks Like Mona Lisa" – 2:32
"Too Little Too Late" – 2:16
"Streetcorner Ambassador" – 3:28
"Must Be Luff" – 2:45
"Russian Roulette" – 3:33 (hidden track)

Personnel
Michelle Shocked – vocals, acoustic guitar
Pete Anderson – electric guitar, six-string bass guitar
Skip Edwards – piano, Hammond organ
Jeff Donavan – drums
James Cruce – drums on "On the Greener Side"
Dusty Wakeman – electric bass
Dominic Genova – upright bass
Lenny Castro – percussion
Freebo (a.k.a. Daniel Friedberg) – tuba
Zachary Richard – accordion
Lee Thornburg – trumpet
David Stout – trombone
Beverly Dahlke-Smith – baritone saxophone, clarinet
Steve Grove – tenor saxophone
Paul Glasse – mandolin
Don Reed – strings
John Begzian – emulator program

Technical personnel
Pete Anderson – producer, arrangements
Peter Doell – engineer (Capitol Studio B)
David Leonard – mixing engineer (Skip Sailor Recording, Sound Castle Studio, The Enterprise)
Don Murray – mixing engineer on 8, 9 & 10.
Charlie Paakkari – additional engineer
Stephen Marcussen – mastering engineer (Precision Lacquered)
Barb Hein – production assistant
Ross Garfield – custom drums and tuning (Drum Doctor)
Jaime Hernandez – cover art (Fantagraphics)

Charts

References

1989 albums
Michelle Shocked albums
Albums produced by Pete Anderson
Mercury Records albums